The Jaune River (English: Yellow River) is a tributary of the Saint-Charles River flowing in the administrative region of Capitale-Nationale, in the province of Quebec, Canada. The course of the river crosses:
 the La Jacques-Cartier Regional County Municipality: municipalities of Stoneham-et-Tewkesbury and lac-Beauport;
 Quebec City.

The main roads serving this small valley are rue Jacques-Bédard, rue des Chalets, chemin de la Grande Ligne, rue du Vallon, boulevard Henri-Bourassa, rue de Champéry, boulevard du Lac and chemin du Tour-du-Lac.

The surface of the Jaune River (except the rapids areas) is generally frozen from the beginning of December to the end of March; however, safe circulation on the ice is generally done from the end of December to the beginning of March. The water level of the river varies with the seasons and the precipitation; the spring flood occurs in March or April.

Geography 
The Jaune River originates at the confluence of two mountain streams about 10 km north of Beauport Lake, in the southwestern part of the grounds of the Séminaire de Québec. This river flows south through the Notre-Dame-des-Laurentides sector, at Charlesbourg, before flowing into the Saint-Charles River at Lac-Saint-Charles.

The Jaune River sub-basin is located in a leafy area characterized mainly by the climatic range of the maple forest with yellow birch and beech.

Land use in the Jaune River sub-basin is essentially forest and most of the territory is in its natural state. Human activity is present in the form of low-density urban developments on the banks of the Jaune River and Lake Beauport and some recreational and tourist facilities (skiing, golf, accommodation establishments, summer camps). The Jaune River sub-basin is also characterized by the presence of a large number of dams, often used for recreational and resort purposes.

  to the southeast, collecting the outlet (coming from the west) from Lake Paisible, to the outlet (coming from the east) from Beauport Lake;
  to the south, collecting the outlet (coming from the west) from Neigette and Écho lakes, crossing Simons waterfall, collecting an unidentified stream (coming from the northwest), to the outlet (coming from the west) of Lakes Jaune and Josée;
  to the south by winding through a flared and steep valley, crossing the Notre-Dame-des-Laurentides neighborhood and branching west towards the end of the segment, up to the Laurentian highway;
  south-west passing north-west of Mont Irma-LeVasseur, the summit of which reaches , meandering through a plain in urban areas and collecting the Valet stream (coming from the north) at the end of the segment, until its mouth.

From this confluence, the current descends on  generally towards the south-east, then towards the north-east, following the course of the Saint-Charles River.

Toponymy 
From 1898 to 1928, Rivière-Jaune was the name of the post office serving a small town established around the Pelletier mill. The parish church of Notre-Dame-des-Laurentides, founded in 1905, was located at this location; its development was long linked to forest work and the wood industries. As for the name Rivière Jaune, it is old and Joseph Bouchette quotes it in 1815. It would be explained by the yellow color of the waters which run on a bottom in several sandy places.

The toponym "rivière Jaune" was formalized on December 5, 1968, at the Commission de toponymie du Québec.

References 

 Brodeur, C., F. Lewis, E. Huet-Alegre, Y. Ksouri, M.-C. Leclerc and D. Viens. 2007. Portrait of the Saint-Charles river basin. Saint-Charles river basin council. 216 p + 9 annexes 217-340 pp

See also 

 La Jacques-Cartier Regional County Municipality
 Quebec City
 Stoneham-et-Tewkesbury
 Charlesbourg
 Lac-Beauport
 Lac-Saint-Charles
 Saint-Charles River
 Beauport Lake
 List of rivers of Quebec

Rivers of Capitale-Nationale
Landforms of Quebec City
La Jacques-Cartier Regional County Municipality